The Hyderabad–Falaknuma route (HF) is a rapid transit service of the Multi-Modal Transport System of Hyderabad, India. Spanning 17 stations, it runs between Nampally (Hyderabad) and Falaknuma three times daily.

Stations 

Rail transport in Telangana
Hyderabad MMTS